Roberto Salvadori (born 29 July 1950) is a former Italian professional footballer who played as a full-back.

In 2015, he was inducted into Torino F.C. Hall of Fame.

Career
In his youth, Mazzoni played for Magenta.

In 1969, he was bought by Verbania, where he spent three seasons before being bought by Alessandria. In Alessandria, he spent one season, winning the 1972–73 Coppa Italia Serie C.

He was then bought by Torino for ₤290 million, where he played from 1973 to 1983, making a total of 265 appearances and scoring 3 goals. With Torino, he won the 1975–76 Serie A, to which he contributed by playing all 30 league games.

He ended his career at Alessandria in 1984.

Honours

Player
Alessandria
Coppa Italia Serie C: 1972–73	

Torino
Serie A: 1975–76

Individual 
Torino F.C. Hall of Fame: 2015

References

External links
 

Living people
1950 births
Italian footballers
Torino F.C. players
U.S. Alessandria Calcio 1912 players
Association football fullbacks